The Sunblood Formation is a geologic formation in Northwest Territories. It preserves fossils dating back to the Ordovician period.  It comprises dolomite, sandstones and limestones, locally silty (giving rise to a vivid colouration through weathering).

See also

 List of fossiliferous stratigraphic units in Northwest Territories

References

 

Ordovician Northwest Territories
Ordovician northern paleotropical deposits